= Clarke's generalized Jacobian =

In mathematics, Clarke's generalized Jacobian is a generalization of the Jacobian matrix of a smooth function to non-smooth functions. It was introduced by Clarke (1983).
